Louis Veuve (1899 – 25 December 1969) was a Swiss wrestler. He competed in the Greco-Roman middleweight event at the 1924 Summer Olympics.

References

External links
 

1899 births
1969 deaths
Olympic wrestlers of Switzerland
Wrestlers at the 1924 Summer Olympics
Swiss male sport wrestlers
Place of birth missing